Tove Maës (30 April 192131 December 2010) was a Danish actress of stage, television and film best known for her starring roles in the series of "Morten Korch" films, in particular The Red Horses. Maës was a three-time recipient of the Bodil Award for Best Actress, winning in 1954, 1971, and 1983.

Career 
Maës was born in Copenhagen, Denmark on 30 April 1921. She studied with the Danish actor Albert Luther and, in 1942, was "discovered" by Theater Director Helge Rungwald who employed Maës at the Odense Theater. Shortly thereafter, Maës played the lead in Selma Lagerlöf's Dunungen. Maës sought an apprenticeship at the Royal Danish Theatre after appearing there in Carl Erik Soya's Natteherberget, but was turned down. Instead, she worked at the Riddersalen theater, performing in a series of roles.

In 1946, Maës made a critically acclaimed screen debut as Ditte Godpige in the filmatization of Martin Andersen Nexø's novel, Ditte Menneskebarn (Ditte, Child of Man). Her performance in the film about the hardships of a young impoverished girl received international recognition. Especially noticed was her thoroughly wholesome and pure sensualism even while bathing nude. However, film reviewers in the United States (where the movie was seen in an edited version which removed any nudity) dismissed the movie as being too melodramatic. Maës replied in a later interview that the American audience had never been confronted with poverty in such a realistic portrayal on screen. During the 1950s, Maës performed in many of light-hearted films in the role of the sweet young ingenue. She played starring roles in several family films adapted from the popular Morten Korch novels, the first of which, The Red Horses, became the biggest box-office success in Danish cinema. Maës also was able to bring a more serious side to her acting, and in 1954, she was awarded the Bodil Award for Best Supporting Actress for her portrayal of an insane girl in 's experimental film, .

Maës focused again on her stage work during the 1960s with several performances at the Århus Theatre. In 1966, she caused a public reaction when she went against her usual movie persona, playing against type in the role of a prostitute named Lucy in the black comedy Galgenhumor (Gallows Humor). She explained that she was tired of playing the nice young girl. She also began acting in a series of roles playing middle-aged mothers and wives. The film, directed by Henning Ørnbak and Leif Petersen, was an adaptation of Petersen's stage play that had debuted one year earlier with Maës in the same role. Maës' portrayal of the drunken and grotesque mother of a small-time criminal brought her the Bodil Award for Best Actress. For the 1975 comedy film Ta' det some en mand, frue! (Take it Like a Man, Miss!) she was awarded the Mathilde Prize from the Danish Women's Society. She again won the Bodil Award in 1982 for her performance as an overlooked but fantasy-filled retiree in Erik Clausen's drama Felix.

Maës is noted for a number of supporting roles on television series including the sister, Jette on Rundt om Selma, the mother in the adaptation of Pirandello's Six Characters in Search of an Author, the subdued Lilly Lund on Matador, and Mrs. Zachariasen on the TV mini-series The Kingdom.

Personal life 
Maës married Danish actor, writer and director Carl Ottosen in 1942. They were subsequently divorced and Maës married a second time to press photographer Jesper Gottschalch with whom she had a son in 1952.

She died in her home on 31 December 2010 at age 89.

Filmography 

 Onde år (1995) (TV)
 Riget (1994) TV mini-series .... Mrs. Zakariasen ... a.k.a. The Kingdom
 Bryllupsfotografen (1994) .... Stine Svare
  (1990) .... Adam's Mother ... a.k.a. The Man Who Wanted to Be Guilty
 Dansen med Regitze (1989) .... Vera ... a.k.a. Memories of a Marriage
 Isolde (1989) .... Older Married Woman
 Hip hip hurra! (1987) .... Kröyer's Mother
  (1987) .... Esther
 Felix (1982) .... Inger Marie Maage
  (1980) (voice)
 Matador .... Lilly Lund
 Historien om en moder (1979) .... Teacher  ... a.k.a. The Story of a Mother
  (1978)
  (1976) .... Doctor ... a.k.a. The Gangster's Apprentice
  (1975) .... Ellen Rasmussen ... a.k.a. Take it Like a Man, Madam
 Mig og mafiaen (1973) .... Lily ... a.k.a. Me and the Mafia
 Seks roller søger en forfatter (1973) (TV) .... Mother ... a.k.a. Six Characters in Search of an Author
  (1972) .... Mette Hansen ... a.k.a. The Vicar of Vejlby
 Rundt om Selma (1971) (TV) .... Jette
 Frisørinden (1971) (TV) .... The Mother
 Familie Werner auf Reisen (1971) (TV) .... Leena Bahn
  (1971) .... Gerda Knudsen ... a.k.a. 
 Daddy, Darling (1970) .... Segrid
 Premiere (1970) (TV) .... Ina
 En nøgle til ...? (1970) .... Emma
 Bella (1970) (TV) .... Jacob's Mother
 Sangen om den røde rubin (1970) .... Maja ... a.k.a. The Song of the Red Ruby
 Tre slags kærlighed (1970) .... Old Woman ... a.k.a. 
  (1969) .... Lady of the House ... a.k.a. I'll Take Happiness
 Manden der tænkte ting (1969) .... The Cashier ... a.k.a. The Man Who Thought Life
 Elsk... din næste! (1967) .... Citizen of Mårböosen ... a.k.a. Love Thy Neighbour
  (1967)
 The Reluctant Sadist (1967) .... Vibeke Poulsen ... a.k.a. The Reluctant Sadist
  (1966) ... a.k.a. Unfaithful (International: English title)
  (1966) .... Bitten
 I, a Lover (1966) .... Patient hos Ulla Pauce ... a.k.a. I, a Lover
 I, a Woman (1965) .... Siv's Mother ... a.k.a. I, a Woman
 Bussen (1963) .... Sofie
 Det stod i avisen (1962) .... Woman with carriage
  (1961) .... Postmaster
  (1958) .... Clinician Hansen
 Hidden Fear (1957)
 Flintesønnerne (1956) .... Else Flint
 Himlen er blaa (1954) .... Grete
 Det gamle guld (1951) .... Grethe Holm
 Fodboldpræsten (1951) .... Lilly
  (1951) .... Gudrun Andersen
 Mosekongen (1950) .... Hanne
 De røde heste (1950) .... Bente Munk ... a.k.a. The Red Horses
 Thorkild Roose (1949)
  (1948)
  (1948) .... Linda Strang
 De pokkers unger (1947) .... Vera
 Ditte menneskebarn (1946) .... Ditte ... a.k.a. Ditte, Child of Man
 Jeg elsker en anden (1946) ... a.k.a. I Love Another
  (1946) .... Office Lady Else Tiesen

References

External links 
 Film in Denmark (In Danish)
 Dansk Kvindebiografisk Leksikon
 
 Det Danske Filminstitut: Tove Maës

1921 births
2010 deaths
Actresses from Copenhagen
Best Actress Bodil Award winners
Danish film actresses
Danish stage actresses
Danish television actresses